Ptycholoma imitator is a species of moth of the  family Tortricidae. It is found in China (Heilongjiang, Jilin, Fujian), the Korean Peninsula, Japan (Hokkaido, Honshu) and Russia (Amur, Siberia). The habitat consists of oak forests, cedar broad-leaved forests, fir broad-leaved forests, valley broad-leaved forests and gardens.

The wingspan is 18–24 for males and 24 mm for females. Adults are on wing from July to August.

The larvae feed on the fruit of various plants, including Betula dahurica, Malus pumila, Malus sibirica, Salix rorida and Prunus pseudocerasus. They live within rolled leaves. The species overwinters as a young larva. Pupation takes place within the rolled leaf.

References

Moths described in 1900
Archipini